Washboard Jungle is a four-man group that combines elements of folk music, classic rock, comedy, dance, and performance art. The members include Bob Goldberg (keyboards, accordion, bulbul tarang, percussion, vocals), Henry Hample (banjo, fiddle, mandolin, ukulele, percussion, vocals), McPaul Smith (bass guitar, jug, percussion, vocals), and Stuart Cameron Vance (guitars, kazoo, percussion, vocals). They took their name from the movie Blackboard Jungle.

The group was founded in New York City in 1989 by Henry Hample, the son of noted humorist Stuart Hample. Often referred to as a "post-modern jug band," they've used up to 40 musical instruments and household utensils in their live shows, including washboards, spoons, bongos, pennywhistle, melodica, a potato masher, a carrot grater, a toy hammer, a vacuum cleaner, water glasses, and digital samplers. They reinterpret traditional folk songs, and the songs of other artists ranging from Hoagy Carmichael to Pink Floyd, but also write original songs in a comic vein.

The group has a longstanding relationship with the New York experimental performance space Dixon Place, and has performed at other New York theatrical and music venues, including regular appearances in the "No Shame" series at the Public Theater. They have also toured to festivals, colleges, and other venues from Maine to North Carolina. They sometimes perform for children, and they continue to receive airplay on kids' radio programs. They officially disbanded in 1994 but have reunited several times since.

A poster advertising the band is visible briefly during a scene in the 1993 film Manhattan Murder Mystery, behind Woody Allen's character.

Discography 

The Wash Cycle, 1994
The Brown Album, 2000
Sunnyland, 2016

References

External links 
Washboard Jungle's official website
Washboard Jungle on AllMusic.com
Bob Goldberg on Reverb Nation
Henry Hample's website
McPaul Smith on IMDB
Stuart Vance's website

American children's musical groups
American folk musical groups
Jug bands
Musical groups established in 1989
Musical groups from New York City
Rock music groups from New York (state)